Camaderry at , is the 90th-highest peak in Ireland on the Arderin scale, and the 112th-highest peak on the Vandeleur-Lynam scale.   Camaderry is situated in the southern sector of the Wicklow Mountains range, and forms a broad horseshoe around the valley of Glendalough with the hydroelectric station at Turlough Hill , and the mountains of  Conavalla , and Lugduff . Camaderry has a subsidiary summit, Camaderry South East Top , and both lie across the deep Wicklow Gap from Tonelagee , which sits on the "central spine" of the Wicklow range.

Lough Nahanagan

Between the north face of Camaderry and the east face of Turlough Hill lies Lough Nahanagan, a deep corrie lake carved by a glacier at the end of the last ice age.   The lake is associated with several Irish folk-stories.  The cliffs of the corrie around Lough Nahanagan are used by rock-climbers with single-pitch graded routes of up to VS 4c.

Mining
Camaderry mountain contains the Luganure mineral vein which is a source of lead in the form of galena (PbS), and also contains traces of silver. In 1859 the Glendasan and Glendalough mines were connected with each other by a series of tunnels called adits, which are now mostly flooded, through the mountain.  After several revivals, mining ceased in Camaderry in 1957; however, remains of the Miner's Village at Glendalough can still be seen.

Bibliography

Gallery

See also

Wicklow Way
Wicklow Mountains
Lists of mountains in Ireland
List of mountains of the British Isles by height
List of Hewitt mountains in England, Wales and Ireland

References

External links
MountainViews: The Irish Mountain Website, Camaderry
MountainViews: Irish Online Mountain Database
The Database of British and Irish Hills , the largest database of British Isles mountains ("DoBIH")
Hill Bagging UK & Ireland, the searchable interface for the DoBIH

Mountains and hills of County Wicklow
Hewitts of Ireland
Mountains under 1000 metres
Climbing areas of Ireland